Phylloxiphia punctum is a moth of the family Sphingidae. It is known from savanna from north-eastern South Africa to Zimbabwe, Zambia, the Democratic Republic of the Congo and Tanzania.

The length of the forewings is about 35 mm. Females are somewhat larger and have more rounded wings. The head and thorax are bright pinkish brown, but the abdomen is paler. The forewings are long and narrow, pinkish brown with a blackish dot near the apex and a reddish inner marginal basal streak. The hindwings are pinkish orange.

References

Punctum
Lepidoptera of the Democratic Republic of the Congo
Lepidoptera of Namibia
Lepidoptera of South Africa
Lepidoptera of Tanzania
Lepidoptera of Zambia
Lepidoptera of Zimbabwe
Moths of Sub-Saharan Africa
Moths described in 1907